Oscaecilia is a genus of caecilians in the family Caeciliidae. The genus is distributed in southeastern Central America (Costa Rica, Panama) and northern South America, possibly extending into southern Brazil. They are sometimes known as the South American caecilians.

Description
Adult Oscaecilia often exceed  in total length. The diagnostic characters of Oscaecilia include eyes that are covered by bone, presence of splenial teeth, absence of true tail, and a tentacular opening that is directly below the nostril, much closer to it than to the eye.

Species 
There are nine recognized species:

References

 
Amphibian genera
Amphibians of Central America
Amphibians of South America
Taxa named by Edward Harrison Taylor
Taxonomy articles created by Polbot